The following is a list of schools in Nepal's Rupandehi District with students taking the School Leaving Certificate (SLC), as of 2015 (2071). 

A R D Model English Secondary School Siddharthanagar
Aama Ma.Vi., Aama
Adarsh Vidya Mandir English Boarding School Siddharthnagar
Aims English Higher Secondary School, Butwal
Amar Jyoti English Medium School Bhairahawa
Amar Secondary School, Motipur-9
Apex School, Shankarnagar-5
Araniko English School, Bhalwari
Asian Light English Boarding School, kerwani
Axis Higher Secondary School, Butwal-10
Bahira Bal Vidhyalaya, Siddharthanagar-2
Balrampur Ma.vi.bhagawanpur
Bangain Ma.vi. Khadwa Bangain-6
Barewa Higher Secondary School, Kamhariya
Barwaliya Ma.vi., Gangoliya-3
Belahiya Secondary School, Belahiya
Bhabisya Nirman Higher Secondary School, Dhekawar Kerawani
Bhagalapur Higher Secondary School,  Manapakadi-4
Bhainsahi Ma Vi Rudrapur Bhainsahi
Bhairahawa Model Higher Secondary School, Bhairahawa
Bhanu Ma Vi Siddharthanagar
Bhimsen Memorial High School Siddharthanagar
Bhujauli English School, Kha Bangai-7
Bhulke Secondary School Makrahar
Birendra Secondary School, Dayanagar-5
Bodwar Secondary School Bodwar
Bogadi Secondary School Bogadi
Brihaspati Higher Secondary School Siddharthanagar
Buddha Adarsha Ma Vi Lumbini
Buddha Deep English Boarding Higher Secondary School Rudrapur
Buddha Gyan Niketan English Boarding High School
Buddha Jyoti Ma Vi Siddarthanagar
Butwal Elite Higher Secondary School, Butwal
Butwal Eminent English School Sukha Nagar
Butwal Ex-army English Higher ko School, Butwal
Butwal Glory English Boarding School Belbas Butwal
Butwal Ma Vi Butwal
Butwal Public School Shankar Nagar
C B Public School Newroad
Cambridge English Boarding School Kalikanagar
Canon Higher Secondary School Sukhanagar Butwal
Chhipgadh Secondary School, Chhipgadh
Chhotaki Ramnagar Ma Vi Chhotaki
Child Care Newlife  English Academy Makrahar
Cosmic Academy, Butwal-3, Golpark, Chidiyakhola Ramaphitecas Path
Chilhiya Ma Vi Chilhiya
Crystal Knowledge Academy Mangalpur
Dawn Children's English School, Anandavan
Deep Boarding High School, Butwal-10, Sukkhanagar
Devdaha Buddha Public English Boarding High School Devdaha-2
Devdaha English Boarding School, devdaha -4
Devdaha Higher Secondary School, Devdaha
Devdaha Mother Tongues Academy Devdaha
Dream Vision School Of Pharsatikar
Durga Bhawani Higher Secondary School, parroha-6 Bankatta
Durga Ma.vi. Gajedi
Durga Ma.vi., Tikuligadh
Durga Shaikshik Griha, Amuwa-3
Durga Vaidik Sanskrit Vidyapith Shankaafjal

Ebenezer And New Vision Uchha Ma Vi, Butwal-14
Eden English Boarding School, Naharpur, Butwal-16
Ever Shining English Boarding Higher Secondary School
Everest English Boarding Higher Secondary School, Butwal-10
Evergreen English School, Rudrapur-7, Haraiya
Gairgatti Ma.vi. Hati Bangain
Gajedi Higher Secondary School, Gajedi
Galaxy English Boarding High School Parroha
Ganesh Gyan Jyoti Public Ma Vi Semlar
Gargi Academy School Butwal
Gautam Buddha English Boarding School Shankarnagar
Gautam Buddha Higher Secondary School, Kewalani
Girvan Saraswati San Tatha Sadharan Ma Vi Manigram Anandban
Green Plant Boarding Higher Secondary School, Devdaha
Gurauliya Secondary School, Man Materiya
Guruwani Mai Secondary School Parasahawa, Gonaha
Gyan Jyoti Secondary School Devdaha
Gyan Punj Bidhya Mandir, Manpakadi-4
Gyanodaya Ma Vi Butwal
Gyanodaya Ratri Ma Vi Butwal
Gyanpunja English Boarding School Butwal
Haraiya Ma Vi Haraiya
Hasanapur Secondary School Hasanapur
Hazi Ainyatullah Ma Vi Semrahna Gonaha
Ideal English Boarding School Deepnagar Butwal
Jan Jagriti Ma Vi Jogikuti Shankar Nagar
Jana Jagriti Ma Vi Karuwani
Jana Jyoti Higher Secondary School  Dingarnagar Shankarnagar
Jana Kalyan Ma Vi Dudharaksh Bharatpur
Jana Priya Ma Vi Devdaha Bhaluhi
Janabhawana Ma Vi Karahiya
Janachetana Secondary School, Dudharakshya
Janahit Ma.vi. Mainhawa Makrahar-1, kanchhibazzar
Janata Higher Secondary School, Pashim-amawa
Janata Higher Secondary School, Silautia
Janata Ma.vi., Devdaha
Janata Secondary School Makrahar
Janta Ma.vi. Butwal
Janta Ma.vi. Tikuligadh
Jaycees Kindergarten High School Siddhartha Nagar
Jogada Ma Vi Jogada
Kalika Higher Secondary School, Kalikanagar, Butwal
Kalika Public High School Bethari
Kanti Higher Secondary School (ol), Butwal
Kanti Higher Secondary School, Butwal
Kanti Punja Awasiya Madhyamik Vidhyalaya, Butwal
Karmahawa Ma Vi Karmahawa
Kashi Noble Academy, Siddharthanagar
Kerwani Higher Secondary School,  Devdaha
Khadga Ma Vi Durganagar
Khudabagar Ma Vi Khudabagar
Kotiyadevi Ma.vi., Saljhandi-8
Krishak Adarsha Higher Secondary School, Betkuiyan-6
Kunwarwarti English Boarding School Pradeepnagar
Laxmi Ma Vi Butwal
Linhson Buddhist School Kamhariya
Little Birds English School
Little Flower English High School Shankarnagar
Little Flowers English Higher Secondary School Saupharsatikar
Little Paradise English Medium School, Bhalwari
Little Rose Boarding School Gajedi
Little Star Boarding High School Madhawallya
Lord Gautam Buddha English Boarding High School Padsari
Lumbini Boarding School Butwal-6
Lumbini Gyanniketan Higher Secondary School, Rudrapur
Lumbini Shikshalaya, Kalikanagar, Butwal-13
Lumbini Sishu Sadan Boarding School
Madhawaliya Secondary School, Madhawaliya-2
Madhubani Ma Vi Madhubani
Mahabir English School, Butwal-2
Mahamaya Bhawani Higher Secondary School,  Kerwani
Mahatma Buddha Ma Vi Piparhiya
Mahendranagar Ma Vi Suryapura
Mainhiya Higher Secondary School, Mainhiya
Malawar Devi Ma.vi. Rudrapur
Malmaladevi Ma Vi Dudharakshya
Manakamana English High School Siddhartha Nagar
Manavgyan Higher Secondary School, Butwal-12, Ramnagar
Marchabar Adarsha Ma Vi Majhagawa
Maryadpur Ma Vi Maryadpur
Masina Baba Narendrapuri Moglaha  Secondary School, Masina-6
Minerva English Boarding High School Padsari 5
Mission Mount Academy, Butwal
Montessori Memorial Boarding High School
Moon Light Higher Secondary Boarding School, Siddharthanagar
Motherland Academy Kerawani
Motherland English School Motipur-2
Motipur Higher Secondary School, Motipur
Muddila Secondary School, Karauta-1
Munal English Boarding School Butwal-8
Nabin Audhyogic Kadar Bahadur Rita Secondary School, Butwal
Namuna English Boarding High School, Makrahar-2
Namuna English Boarding School, Belbas, Butwal-12
Narayani Public High School, Kerwani
Nava Prabhat English School Saljhandi
Nawa Jyoti English Boarding School Karahiya
Nawadurga Ma.Vi., Bishnupura-1
Nayagaun Uchha Ma.Vi., Butwal-14, Nayagaun
Nepal Evergreen Public English School, Motipur, Butwal-18
Nepal Nalanda Secondary Boarding School Siddhartha
New Academy English Boarding School, Sainamaina-3
New Environment English Secondary School Manigram
New Era Boarding Higher Secondary School, Siddhartha Nagar
New Horizon English Boarding Higher Secondary School Butwal
New Light Higher Secondary School, Shankarnagar
New Model English Secondary School Siddharthanagar
New Moon Academy Padsari
New Namuna Boarding High School Devdaha
New Pinewood English Boarding School Butwal-5
New Standard English School Nayagaun Butwal
Nilgiri Children's English Boarding School, Makrahar
Our National Boarding High School Butwal-10
Our Peaceland Academy, Butwal
Oxford Higher Secondary School, Butwal
Oxford Modern English High School Gajedi
Pajarkatti Ma.vi., Pajarkatti
Paklihawa Ma Vi Bhairahawa
Pamir International Academy, Shankarnagar-3
Paramount Boarding Higher Secondary School, Shankarnagar
Parroha Higher Secondary School Ramnagar
Paschim Pahuni Ma Vi
Paschim Parroha Secondary School, Parroha-3
Pashchimanchal English School Siddharthanagar
Pashupati Higher Secondary School, Kotihawa
Pashupati Ma Vi Saljhandi
Pashupati Shikshya Mandir, Siddhartha Nagar-6
Pearl International Academy Higher Secondary School
Pharsatikar Higher Secondary School, Sau Pharsatikar
Pharsatikar Siddhartha E.B. school, Sau Pharsatikar
Piparahawa Ma.vi. Piparahawa
Pokharvindi Secondary School, Bhatpurawa
Prabhat English Boarding Higher Secondary School, Sainamaina
Pragati Ma.vi. Gajedi-2 Belbhariya
Pragati Secondary School, Siktahan-6
Pratibha English Boarding School Madhubani
Private Rupandehi
Public Higher Secondary School, Dayanagar Chhapiya
Ram Naresh Yadav Ma Vi Dhakdhai
Ramapur Ma Vi Ramapur
Ramapur Revival English Boarding School, Sainamaina-10
Rastriya Secondary School Dudharakchhe
Rose Bud Academy, Pa-amuwa-4
Rudrapur Ma Vi Rudrapur
Rudrapur Peace Land Bhupu Sainik Public English School, Rudrapur
Rupandehi Lilaram Neupane Ma Vi, Siddharthanagar
Sadhana Mahila Vidhyalaya Butwal
Sadi Ma.vi., Sadi-7
Sagarmatha Higher Secondary Boarding School, Devdaha-5
Sai Global Higher Secondary School, Siddharthanagar
Saina Maina Higher Secondary School, Paroha
Saina Maina Memorial School Parroha
Saljhandi Ma Vi Saljhandi
Sanjivani Shiksha Sadan, Madhawaliya-3
Sanskar English Boarding School, Shivpur
Sanskrit Vidhyasram Shantinagar
Saraswati  Secondary School, Rudrapur-4, Bargadawa
Saraswati Gyan Niketan English Boarding School, Dayanagar-3
Saraswati Ma.vi., Kerwani-2
Saraswati Secondary English Boarding School, Devdaha-5
Saraswati Secondary School, Dudharaksha
Scholars Home English Boarding School Butwal
Semara Bazar Ma Vi Karhiya
Shree Semari Secondary School Semari,
 Kamrahiya-6
Seven Star English Boarding School, Kerwani
Shaheed Smarak Boarding School, Butwal-10
Shankar Secondary School, Sau-pharsatikar
Shankarnagar Durgadatta Uchcha Ma Vi, shankarnagar-2
Shanta Jyoti English Boarding School Dayanagar Durgapur
Shanti Model Higher Secondary School, Manigram Anandban
Shining Star English Boarding School Deep Nagar
Shishai Secondary School, Khadawa Bangai
Shivapur Higher Secondary School, Shivapur, Makrahar
Shree Buddha English School, Sainamaina-9
Shree Ganesh English School, Semlar-3
Shree Naharpur Higher Secondary School, Butwal-16
Shree Nawaratna Higher Secondary School, Semlar
Shreemati Manraji Devi Ma.Vi. Rayapur-5, Marchwar
Siddharth Pratibha English Boarding School Suryapura
Siddhartha English Boarding School, Shankarnagar
Siddhartha Ma.Vi., Amawa
Siddhartha Memorial Academy Dudharaksha
Siddheswar Lal Kumari Higher Secondary School, Butwal
Siddhi Children's Academy Boarding School Butwal-10
Siddhi Vinayak Ma.Vi., Semlar
Sita Ma.Vi. Devdaha
Skyland English High School
Smriti English Boarding School, Jogikuti
St. Joseph English Higher Secondary  School, Bhalwari
Summit English Boarding School Pulchowk Butawal
Sun Model English Boarding School Rudrapur
Sungabha Public School Parroha Murgiya
Sunshine Boarding High School Siddharthanagar
Suryapura Higher Secondary School, Suryapura
Susanskrit Ma Vi Shantinagar
Tenuhawa Samudayik Ma Vi Tenuhawa
Thutipipal Ma Vi Thutipipal
Tikuligadh Ma Vi Tikuligadh
Tilottama English Higher Secondary School Sau- Pharsatikar
Tilottama Ma.vi. Butwal
Tinau English Boarding School Devinagar
Tribhuwan Children's Academy Butwal
Ujir Singh Ma Vi Butwal
Unique Homes English Boarding School Dhakdhai
Universal Public School, Bhairahawa
Western Academy, Butwal
Yugjyoti Ma.Vi., Devdaha

See also 

 Education in Nepal
 List of schools in Nepal

References 

Rupandehi District